Branden Horton (born 9 September 2000) is an English professional footballer who plays as a left back for Chesterfield.

Career

Doncaster Rovers
Born in Doncaster, Horton began his career with Doncaster Rovers, making two EFL Trophy appearances for the club in the 2018–19 season.

He moved on loan to Gainsborough Trinity in November 2018.

Horton turned professional with Doncaster in April 2019.

At the end of August 2019 he returned to Gainsborough Trinity, initially on a one month loan. The loan was extended in October 2019.

On 21 September 2020, Horton joined Southern League Premier Division Central side Redditch United on loan until January 2021. On 15 January 2021, Horton was recalled by parent club Doncaster Rovers.

He made his Football League debut on 16 March 2021. Following relegation to League Two, Horton was released by the club at the end of the 2021–22 season.

Chesterfield
On 14 June 2022, Horton agreed to join National League club Chesterfield upon the expiration of his contract with Doncaster Rovers on 1 July.

Career statistics

References

2000 births
Living people
Footballers from Doncaster
English footballers
Doncaster Rovers F.C. players
Gainsborough Trinity F.C. players
Redditch United F.C. players
Chesterfield F.C. players
Association football fullbacks
English Football League players
Northern Premier League players